Say So is the third studio album by American art rock band Bent Knee. It's the band's only record to be published by Cuneiform Records.

Track listing

Personnel 
Ben Levin – guitar, vocals
Chris Baum – violin, vocals
Courtney Swain – lead vocals, keyboards
Gavin Wallace-Ailsworth – drums
Jessica Kion – bass, vocals
Vince Welch – synths, sound design, production

Additional personnel 
 Andy Bergman – alto saxophone, clarinet
 Ben Swartz – cello
 Bryan Murphy – trumpet
 Geni Skendo – flute, shakuhachi
 Geoff Nielsen – trombone
 James Dineen – voice acting
 Keith Dickerhofe – cello
 Nathan Cohen – violin
 Sam Morrison – baritone saxophone
 Rebecca Hallowell – viola

References

External links 

 Official website
 Bandcamp

2016 albums
Bent Knee albums
Cuneiform Records albums